Trastamiro Aboazar (c. 980–?) was a medieval Portuguese knight, considered to have been  the first Lord of Maia.

Trastamiro was the son of Aboazar Lovesendes and Unisco Godinhes. Aboazar was married to Dordia Soares, of Asturian origin.

References 

10th-century Portuguese people
11th-century Portuguese people
Portuguese nobility
Portuguese Roman Catholics